Dervorgilla, Derorugilla, Dearbhfhorghaill Derbforgaill is an Irish name, sometimes anglicised as Derval. It can refer to:
 Derbforgaill ingen Maeleachlainn (1109–1193)
 Dervorguilla of Galloway (c. 1210–1290)